Loris Francini (born 12 August 1962) is a Sammarinese politician.

Francini was Captain Regent with Alberto Cecchetti from April 1998 to October 1998. He served as captain-regent for a second term with  Gianfranco Terenzi from 1 April 2006 to 1 October 2006. He is a member of the Sammarinese Christian Democratic Party.

References

1962 births
Captains Regent of San Marino
Members of the Grand and General Council
Living people
Politicians of Catholic political parties
Sammarinese Christian Democratic Party politicians